The 2015 West Coast Conference baseball tournament was held from May 21 through 23, 2015 at Banner Island Ballpark in Stockton, California.   won the four team, double-elimination tournament winner for the second year in a row to earn the league's automatic bid to the 2015 NCAA Division I baseball tournament.

Seeding
The top four finishers from the regular season were seeded one through four based on conference winning percentage.  The teams then played a double elimination tournament until they reach the championship game. The championship game was winner takes all.

Tiebreakers:
BYU finishes 3rd and gets the 3-seed via head-to-head. BYU won 2 of 3 vs. Loyola Marymount during the regular season.
Saint Mary's finishes 8th via head-to-head. Saint Mary's won 2 of 3 vs. Pacific during the regular season.

Results

Box Scores

#4 Loyola Marymount vs. #1 San Diego

#3 BYU vs. #2 Pepperdine

#1 San Diego vs. #3 BYU

#2 Pepperdine vs. #4 Loyola Marymount

#1 San Diego vs. #2 Pepperdine

WCC Championship: #2 Pepperdine vs. #4 Loyola Marymount

All-Tournament Team
The following players were named to the All-Tournament Team.

Most Outstanding Player
Brad Anderson was named Tournament Most Outstanding Player. Anderson hit two home runs in the tournament. In the championship game Anderson came to bat 5 times and was walked three times, with his home run in the first inning tying it up at 1. For the tournament Anderson went 3-for-10, a mere .300, but recorded 3 game tying or winning RBI's, both in elimination games.

References

West Coast Conference Baseball Championship
West Coast Conference baseball tournament
Tournament
Baseball competitions in Stockton, California
College baseball tournaments in California